Enefit Solutions (former names: Eesti Energia Tehnoloogiatööstus and Energoremont) is an engineering company in Jõhvi, Estonia. It is a subsidiary of Eesti Energia. The company designs and manufactures equipment in the fields of energy and industry and offers erection and maintenance services as well as comprehensive technological solutions.

The company was created in 1959 as Eesti Energoremont, based in Narva. It was the engineering and maintenance unit of the power generation industry in Estonia. Another predecessor of the company was the engineering and maintenance unit of the oil-shale mining industry, based in Jõhvi. This unit was later renamed AS Mäetehnika. In 2007, Eesti Energia merged these two subsidiary companies into Eesti Energia Tehnoloogiatööstus.  After the merger, the company continued to operate in two separate facilities in Narva and Jõhvi; however, in 2013 the Narva facility was closed, and all production was moved to Jõhvi.  In 2016, the company was renamed Enefit Solutions.

References

External links

Technology companies of Estonia
Engineering companies of Estonia
1959 establishments in Estonia
Technology companies established in 1959
Ida-Viru County
Manufacturing companies of the Soviet Union